Baseline Rock is an isolated rock lying between Nøst Island and the Flat Islands in Holme Bay, Mac. Robertson Land. It was mapped by Norwegian cartographers from air photos taken by the Lars Christensen Expedition, 1936–37, and so named by the Antarctic Names Committee of Australia because the rock was used as one end of the baseline of a triangulation carried out by Australian National Antarctic Research Expeditions in 1959.

References
 

Rock formations of Mac. Robertson Land